The Dead Zone may refer to:

 The Dead Zone (novel), a  1979 novel by Stephen King
 The Dead Zone (film), a 1983 film adaption of the novel, starring Christopher Walken and directed by David Cronenberg
 The Dead Zone (TV series), a television series on USA Network that ran from 2002 through 2007, loosely based on the King novel
 Dragon Ball Z: Dead Zone, a 1989 motion picture based on the anime Dragon Ball Z

See also
 Dead zone (disambiguation)